The Butler Public Schools is a comprehensive community public school district that serves students in kindergarten through twelfth grade from Butler, in Morris County, New Jersey, United States.

As of the 2021–22 school year, the district, comprised of three schools, had an enrollment of 1,156 students and 109.7 classroom teachers (on an FTE basis), for a student–teacher ratio of 10.5:1.

Students from Bloomingdale attend Butler High School as part of a sending/receiving relationship with the Bloomingdale School District. In the 2021-22 school year, more than 40% of high school students were from Bloomingdale.

The district is classified by the New Jersey Department of Education as being in District Factor Group "DE", the fifth-highest of eight groups. District Factor Groups organize districts statewide to allow comparison by common socioeconomic characteristics of the local districts. From lowest socioeconomic status to highest, the categories are A, B, CD, DE, FG, GH, I and J.

History
Students from Butler attended high school in Paterson, New Jersey until Butler High School was opened in 1903. From the time the school opened, the school served students from much of Morris County, along with those from Bloomingdale, Ringwood, Wanaque and West Milford in Passaic County until they built their own schools or established alternate arrangements with other school districts. In September 1954, the Butler district notified its eight sending communities that growing enrollment of borough residents would mean that there would be no space available at Butler High School and that the local districts serving students from Passaic County communities and Pequannock Township would have to make alternate arrangements by 1958. While Pequannock, Ringwood and Wanaque met the 1958 deadline, West Milford left four years later and Jefferson Township, Kinnelon and Riverdale ended their sending relationship in 1964.

Schools
Schools in the district (with 2021–22 enrollment data from the National Center for Education Statistics) are:

Elementary school
Aaron Decker School with 379 students in grades K-4
James Manco, Principal 
Middle school
Richard Butler School with 299 students in grades 5-8
Michelle Papa, Principal
High school
Butler High School with 455 students in grades 9-12
Rory Fitzgerald, Principal

The Academy for Law and Public Safety is a full-time, four-year high school program located at Butler High School. The Academy focuses on Law, Government and Public Affairs with concentrations in Law, Criminal Justice, Technology, Humanities and Law Enforcement. The Academy was founded in September 2000, as a collaborative effort of the Morris County Vocational School District, the Butler Public Schools and the Morris County Board of County Commissioners.

Administration
Core members of the district's administration are:
Daniel Johnson, Superintendent
Pamela Vargas, Business Administrator / Board Secretary

Board of education
The district's board of education, comprised of nine members, sets policy and oversees the fiscal and educational operation of the district through its administration. The Bloomingdale district sends a non-voting representative to the board. As a Type II school district, the board's trustees are elected directly by voters to serve three-year terms of office on a staggered basis, with three seats up for election each year held (since 2012) as part of the November general election. The board appoints a superintendent to oversee the district's day-to-day operations and a business administrator to supervise the business functions of the district.

References

External links
Butler Public Schools
 
Butler Public Schools, National Center for Education Statistics

Butler, New Jersey
New Jersey District Factor Group DE
School districts in Morris County, New Jersey